Ragnar "Ragge" Torsten Lundberg (22 September 1924 – 10 July 2011) was a Swedish pole vaulter who competed at the 1948, 1952 and 1956 Olympics. He won a bronze medal in 1952 and finished fifth in 1948 and 1956. At the European championships he won a gold in 1950 and a silver in 1954; in 1950 he also won a silver medal in the 110 m hurdles.

During his career Lundberg improved the European pole vault record from 4.32 m to 4.44 m (1948–52) and the Swedish record from 4.21 m to 4.46 m. He held national titles in the pole vault (1948–58) and 110 m hurdles (1949–51 and 1953).

References

External links

Obituary – Aftonbladet (Swedish)

1924 births
2011 deaths
Swedish male pole vaulters
Olympic bronze medalists for Sweden
Athletes (track and field) at the 1948 Summer Olympics
Athletes (track and field) at the 1952 Summer Olympics
Athletes (track and field) at the 1956 Summer Olympics
Olympic athletes of Sweden
European Athletics Championships medalists
Medalists at the 1952 Summer Olympics
Olympic bronze medalists in athletics (track and field)
People from Nybro Municipality
Sportspeople from Kalmar County